The Wilsons Promontory Marine National Park is a protected marine national park located in the South Gippsland region of Victoria, Australia. The  marine park is situated off the southern tip of Wilsons Promontory and extends along the coastline from Norman Bay, near Tidal River, in the west around the southern tip of the promontory to Cape Wellington in the east. It extends offshore to the Glennie and Anser groups of offshore islands.

There are several neighbouring protected areas:
 Wilsons Promontory National Park covers the promontory and nearby offshore islands
 Wilsons Promontory Marine Park covers the ocean facing coastline of the northern section of the promontory, including Norman, Shellback, and Rabbit islands
 Wilsons Promontory Marine Reserve covers the waters adjacent to the Glennie group and between Cape Wellington and Refuge Cove
 Corner Inlet Marine National Park, Corner Inlet Marine and Coastal Park and Nooramunga Marine and Coastal Park protect much of Corner Inlet, to the north-east of the Promontory.
 Shallow Inlet Marine and Coastal Park covers Shallow Inlet to the north-west of the Promontory.
 Rodondo Island to the south is Tasmanian nature reserve

The national park surrounds some of the islands in the Wilsons Promontory Islands Important Bird Area.

See also

 Protected areas of Victoria

References

External links

Ramsar sites in Australia
Marine parks in Victoria (Australia)
Important Bird Areas of Victoria (Australia)
Wilsons Promontory
Coastline of Victoria (Australia)
Protected areas of Bass Strait